Cathy Ladman (born October 15, 1955) is an American stand-up comedian, television writer, and actress. She was featured in her own installment of HBO's One Night Stand comedy series, was a guest on The Tonight Show on ten occasions (1989-1992, 2023), and a guest on The Late Late Show on six occasions (2007-2015). She has had numerous supporting roles in films like Don't Tell Mom the Babysitter's Dead (1991), My Fellow Americans (1996), and White Oleander (2002), and two Mike Nichols films: What Planet Are You From? (2000) and Charlie Wilson's War (2007), as well as TV shows like Roseanne, Dr. Katz, Professional Therapist, Caroline in the City (in a recurring role), Everybody Loves Raymond, Just Shoot Me! and Pretty Little Liars. She was one of the writers of The King of Queens episode "Ice Cubed". She won an American Comedy Award for Best Female Stand-Up Comic in 1992.

Ladman's comedy is self-described as "self-probing, anxiety-venting vehicle" for "exposing personal neurosis".

In 2007, she was featured in the Off-Broadway production J.A.P. - The Princesses of Comedy, which included live standup routines by four female Jewish comics juxtaposed with the stories of legendary performers from the 1950s and 1960s, Totie Fields, Jean Carroll, Pearl Williams, Betty Walker and Belle Barth.

References

External links 

 
 
 Princesses of Comedy (official website) 

1955 births
American comedy writers
American film actresses
American stand-up comedians
American television actresses
American television writers
Jewish American comedians
Jewish American female comedians
Jewish American actresses
Living people
American women comedians
American women television writers
Place of birth missing (living people)
21st-century American Jews
21st-century American women